The USC Trojans football program represents University of Southern California in the sport of American football. The Trojans compete in the Football Bowl Subdivision (FBS) of the National Collegiate Athletic Association (NCAA) and the Pac-12 Conference (Pac-12).

Formed in 1888, the program has 856 wins and claims 11 national championships, including 8 from the major wire-service (AP, Coaches'), heading into the 2022 season. USC has had 13 undefeated seasons including 8 perfect seasons, and 39 conference championships. USC has produced eight Heisman Trophy winners, 81 first-team Consensus All-Americans, including 27 Unanimous selections, and 510 NFL draft picks, most all-time by any university, USC has had 35 members inducted into the College Football Hall of Fame, including former players Matt Leinart, O. J. Simpson, and Ronnie Lott and former coaches John McKay and Howard Jones. The Trojans boast 14 inductees in the Pro Football Hall of Fame, the most of any school, including Junior Seau, Bruce Matthews, Marcus Allen, and Ron Yary.  Among all colleges and universities, as of 2022, USC holds the all-time record for the most quarterbacks (17) and is tied with the University of Miami for the most wide receivers (40) to go on to play in the NFL.

The Trojans have 53 bowl appearances, 39 of which are among the New Year's Six Bowls. With a record of 34–19, USC has the highest all-time post-season winning percentage of schools with 50 or more bowl appearances.

The Trojans play their home games in the Los Angeles Memorial Coliseum, which is located in Exposition Park adjacent to USC's University Park, Los Angeles campus and is managed and operated by the University.

History

1888–1910s

USC first fielded a football team in 1888. Playing its first game on November 14 of that year against the Alliance Athletic Club, USC achieved a 16–0 victory. Frank Suffel and Henry H. Goddard were playing coaches for the first team which was put together by quarterback Arthur Carroll, who in turn volunteered to make the pants for the team and later became a tailor. USC faced its first collegiate opponent the following year in fall 1889, playing St. Vincent's College to a 40–0 victory.

In 1893, USC joined the Intercollegiate Football Association of Southern California (the forerunner of the SCIAC), which was composed of USC, Occidental College, Throop Polytechnic Institute (Cal Tech), and Chaffey College. Pomona College was invited to enter, but declined to do so. An invitation was also extended to Los Angeles High School.

Before they were named Trojans in 1912, USC athletic teams were called the Methodists (occasionally the "Fighting Methodists"), as well as the Wesleyans. During the early years, limitations in travel and the scarcity of major football-playing colleges on the West Coast limited its rivalries to local Southern Californian colleges and universities. During this period USC played regular series against Occidental, Caltech, Whittier, Pomona and Loyola. The first USC team to play outside of Southern California went to Stanford University on November 4, 1905, where they were trampled 16–0 by the traditional West Coast powerhouse. While the teams would not meet again until 1918 (Stanford dropped football for rugby union during the intervening years), this was also USC's first game against a future Pac-12 conference opponent and the beginning of its oldest rivalry. During this period USC also played its first games against other future Pac-12 rivals, including Oregon State (1914), California (1915), Oregon (1915), Arizona (1916) and Utah (1915-1917, 1919).

Between 1911 and 1913, USC followed the example of California and Stanford and dropped football in favor of rugby union. The results were disastrous, as USC was soundly defeated by more experienced programs while the school itself experienced financial reverses; it was during this period that Owen R. Bird, a sportswriter for the Los Angeles Times, coined the nickname "Trojans", which he wrote was "owing to the terrific handicaps under which the athletes, coaches and managers of the university were laboring and against the overwhelming odds of larger and better equipped rivals, the name 'Trojan' suitably fitted the players."

1920s–1930s

After several decades of competition, USC first achieved national prominence under head coach "Gloomy" Gus Henderson in the early 1920s. Another milestone came under Henderson in 1922, when USC joined the Pacific Coast Conference (PCC), the forerunner of the modern Pac-12. Success continued under coach Howard Jones from 1925 to 1940, when the Trojans were just one of a few nationally dominant teams. It was during this era that the team achieved renown as the "Thundering Herd", earning its first four national titles.

1940s–1950s
USC achieved intermittent success in the years following Jones' tenure. Jeff Cravath, who coached from 1942 to 1950, won the Rose Bowl in 1943 and 1945. Jess Hill, who coached from 1951 to 1956, won the Rose Bowl in 1953.  From 1957 to 1959, the Trojans were coached by Don Clark. Future Hall of Famer Ron Mix was an All American for the Trojans in 1959.

1960s–1970s
The program entered a new golden age upon the arrival of head coach John McKay (1960–1975). During this period the Trojans produced two Heisman Trophy winners (Mike Garrett and O. J. Simpson) and won four national championships (1962, 1967, 1972 and 1974). McKay's influence continued even after he departed for the NFL when an assistant coach, John Robinson (1976–1982), took over as head coach. Under Robinson, USC won another national championship in 1978 (shared with Alabama; ironically, USC defeated Alabama, 24–14, that same season) and USC produced two more running-back Heisman Trophy winners in Charles White and Marcus Allen

On September 12, 1970, USC opened the season visiting the University of Alabama under legendary coach Paul "Bear" Bryant and became the first fully integrated team to play in the state of Alabama. The game, scheduled by Bryant, resulted in a dominating 42–21 win by the Trojans. More importantly, all six touchdowns scored by USC team were by black players, two by USC running back Sam "Bam" Cunningham, against an all-white Crimson Tide team. After the game, Bryant was able to persuade the university to allow black players to play, hastening the racial integration of football at Alabama and in the Deep South.

1980s–1990s

In the 1980s, USC football did not realize a national championship, though it continued to experience relative success, with top-20 AP rankings and Pac-10 Conference championships under head coaches Ted Tollner (1983–1986) and Larry Smith (1987–1992) Each coach led the team to a win in the Rose Bowl and USC was recognized among the nation's top-ten teams three times. Despite the moderate success of team during these years, some alumni had grown accustomed to the program's stature as a perennial national championship contender. In 1993, Robinson was named head coach a second time, leading the Trojans to a victory in the 1996 Rose Bowl over Northwestern.

It was during this time that the Trojans were unable to defeat their rivals. They suffered winless streaks of 13 years (1983–1995, including the 1994 17–17 tie) to rival Notre Dame and 8 years (1991–1998) to crosstown rival UCLA which were unacceptable to many USC supporters. Under Robinson the Trojans were 2–2–1 against Notre Dame, but unable to beat UCLA. After posting a 6–6 record in 1996, and a 6–5 record in 1997, Robinson was fired. In 1998, head coach Paul Hackett took over the team, but posted an even more disappointing 19–18 record in three seasons than any of his recent predecessors. By 2000, some observers surmised that USC football's days of national dominance were fading; the football team's record of 37–35 from 1996 to 2001 was their second-worst over any five-year span in history (only the mark of 29–29–2 from 1956 to 1961 was worse), and the period marked the first and only time USC had been out of the final top 20 teams for four straight years.

2000s–2010s

2001
In 2001, athletic director Mike Garrett released Hackett and hired Pete Carroll, a former NFL head coach. Carroll went 6–6 in his first year, losing to Utah in the Las Vegas Bowl, 10–6. After that, his teams became highly successful, ranking among the top ten teams in the country, with the exception of 2009 in which the team lost four regular season games.

2002
USC opened 3–2 in 2002, suffering losses to Kansas State and Washington State. However, the Trojans went on to win the rest of their games, completing the regular season 11–2 on the strength of senior quarterback Carson Palmer's breakout performance. After struggling for most of his collegiate career, Palmer excelled in the Pro Style offense installed by new offensive coordinator Norm Chow. In fact, Palmer's performance, particularly in the season-ending rivalry games against Notre Dame and UCLA, impressed so many pundits that he went on to win the Heisman Trophy, carrying every region of voting and becoming the first USC quarterback to be so honored. Despite tying for the Pac-10 title (with Washington State), having the highest BCS "strength of schedule" rating, and fielding the nation's top defense led by safety Troy Polamalu, USC finished the season ranked No. 5 in the BCS rankings. Facing off against BCS No. 3 Iowa in the Orange Bowl, USC defeated the Hawkeyes 38–17.

2003
In 2003, highly touted but unproven redshirt sophomore Matt Leinart took over the quarterback position from Palmer. Although his first pass went for a touchdown in a win over Auburn, the Trojans suffered an early season triple-overtime loss to their conference rival the California  Golden Bears in Berkeley. After the Loss to California, USC went on a 10-game winning streak and finished the season with a record of 11–1. Before the postseason, both the coaches' poll and the AP Poll ranked USC number 1, but the BCS—which also gave consideration to computer rankings—ranked Oklahoma first, another one-loss team but one that had lost its own Big 12 Conference title game 35–7, with USC ranked third.

In the 2003 BCS National Championship Game, the Sugar Bowl, BCS No. 2 LSU defeated BCS No. 1 Oklahoma 21–14. Meanwhile, BCS No. 3 USC defeated BCS No. 4 Michigan 28–14 in the Rose Bowl. USC finished the season ranked No. 1 in the AP poll and was awarded the AP National Championship; LSU, however, won the BCS National Championship title for that year, prompting a split national title between LSU and USC. In the wake of the controversy, corporate sponsors emerged who were willing to organize an LSU-USC game to settle the matter; nevertheless, the NCAA refused to permit the matchup.

2004

In 2004, USC was picked preseason No. 1 by the Associated Press, thanks to the return of Leinart as well as sophomore running backs LenDale White and Reggie Bush. The defense—led by All-American defensive tackles Shaun Cody and Mike Patterson, as well as All-American linebackers Lofa Tatupu and Matt Grootegoed—was considered to be among the finest in the nation. Key questions included the offensive line, with few returning starters, and the receiving corps, which had lost previous year's senior Keary Colbert and the breakout star of 2003, Mike Williams. Williams had tried to enter the NFL draft a year early during the Maurice Clarett trial when it was ruled that the NFL could not deny them entering the draft. The decision was appealed and overturned leaving Williams unable to enter the draft. When he applied to the NCAA for reinstatement of his eligibility, it was denied.

Despite close calls against Stanford and California, the Trojans finished the regular season undefeated and headed for the 2004 BCS Championship Game at the Orange Bowl. USC was the second team in NCAA football history to have gone wire-to-wire (ranked first place from preseason to postseason since the AP began releasing preseason rankings); the first was Florida State in 1999 (two other schools went wire-to-wire before the existence of preseason polls - Notre Dame in 1943 and Army in 1945). Quarterback Leinart won the Heisman Trophy, with running back Bush placing fifth in the vote tally. The Trojans' opponent in the Orange Bowl, Oklahoma, were themselves undefeated and captained by sixth-year quarterback Jason White, who had won the Heisman in 2003; the game marked the first time in NCAA history that two players who had already won the Heisman played against each other. Most analysts expected the game to be close—as USC matched its speed and defense against the Oklahoma running game and skilled offensive line—but the reality proved to be far different. USC scored 38 points in the first half, and won the BCS National Championship Game by the score of 55–19, making them the BCS Champions and earning the team the AP National Championship as well.

In June 2010, after a four-year investigation, the NCAA imposed sanctions against the Trojan football program for a "lack of institutional control," including a public reprimand and censure, a two-year postseason ban, a loss of 30 scholarships over three years, and vacating all games in which Reggie Bush participated as an ineligible player (14 wins, 1 loss), including the 2005 Orange Bowl, in which the Trojans won the BCS National Championship. These sanctions have been criticized by some NCAA football writers, including ESPN's Ted Miller, who wrote, "It's become an accepted fact among informed college football observers that the NCAA sanctions against USC were a travesty of justice, and the NCAA's refusal to revisit that travesty are a massive act of cowardice on the part of the organization."

Following the NCAA sanctions, BCS Executive Director Bill Hancock stated that a committee would decide whether to vacate USC's 2004 BCS Championship, but the final decision would be delayed until after the NCAA had heard USC's appeals against some of the sanctions. On July 20, 2010, incoming USC president Max Nikias stated that the school would remove jerseys and murals displayed in Bush's honor from its facilities, and would return the school's copy of Bush's Heisman Trophy. On September 14, Bush announced that he would forfeit the Heisman and return his copy of the trophy.

On May 26, 2011, the NCAA upheld all findings and penalties against USC.  The team did not participate in the Pac-12 Football Championship Game or a bowl game during the 2011–12 season. The BCS announced June 6, 2011, that it had stripped USC of the 2004 title, but the Associated Press still recognizes USC as the 2004 AP National Champion.

2005
The 2005 regular season witnessed a resuscitation of the rivalry with Notre Dame, after a last-second play in which senior quarterback Matt Leinart scored the winning touchdown with help from a controversial push from behind by running back Reggie Bush, nicknamed the "Bush Push". The year climaxed with a 66–19 USC defeat of cross-town rival UCLA. Running back Reggie Bush finished his stellar year by winning the Heisman Trophy (later returned by USC and reclaimed by the Heisman Trophy Trust considering Bush accepted improper benefits while at USC and was ineligible during the 2005 season), while Leinart finished third in the Heisman voting. Several other players also earned accolades, being named All-Americans (AP, Football Coaches, Football Writers, Walter Camp, ESPN.com, SI.com, CBS Sportsline.com, Rivals.com, Collegefootballnews.com). These include QB Matt Leinart, RB Reggie Bush, RB LenDale White, S Darnell Bing, OT Taitusi Lutui, OT Sam Baker, WR Dwayne Jarrett, C Ryan Kalil, OG Fred Matua, and DE Lawrence Jackson. Additionally, OL Winston Justice did well enough to forgo his senior year and enter the NFL draft. The regular season ended with two clear-cut contenders facing off in the Rose Bowl to decide the national championship. Both USC and Texas were 12–0 entering the game; although USC was the slight favorite, USC lost to Texas 41–38.

As with the 2004 season, later NCAA investigations into alleged improper benefits given to Reggie Bush altered the official record of the 2005 Trojan season. All twelve wins from the 2005 season were officially vacated.

2006
For the 2006 football season, USC tried to rebuild its strength following the loss of offensive stalwarts Leinart, Bush, and White, defensive leader Bing, and offensive linemen Matua, Justice, and Lutui. The Trojans developed their offense using unproven QB John David Booty and returning star receivers Dwayne Jarrett and Steve Smith along with second-year wide-out Patrick Turner. Mark Sanchez, the highly touted QB of the recruiting class of 2005 (Mission Viejo High School) was widely viewed as a dark horse to win the starting job from Booty, although Booty was named the starter at the end of fall training camp. The starting tailback position was initially a battle between returning players Chauncey Washington and Desmond Reed (both recovering from injuries) and heralded recruits Stafon Johnson (Dorsey High School in Los Angeles), C.J. Gable, Allen Bradford and Emmanuel Moody.

USC had many experienced players as well, including linebacker Dallas Sartz and wide receiver Chris McFoy, who had already graduated with their bachelor's degrees and were pursuing master's degrees. Fullback Brandon Hancock would have been part of that group as well until an injury ended his collegiate career. Additionally, fifth-year (redshirt) senior linebacker Oscar Lua, running back Ryan Powdrell and offensive lineman Kyle Williams were expected to either start or play frequently in 2006.

The 2006 Trojans came out strong, easily defending their top 10 status throughout the year. As the season progressed, USC began to display marked inconsistencies, as their margins of victory began to slip. The first setback proved to be a 31–33 loss to unranked Oregon State, in which the Beavers were able to repeatedly capitalize on several Trojan turnovers. Even though USC dropped initially in the polls, they worked their way back up. After defeating both Cal and Notre Dame, they held the number 2 spot heading into the final week of the season. The Trojans were considered to be a virtual lock for the National Championship Game against Ohio State and just needed to beat UCLA. USC was shocked in the final game of the season, losing to crosstown rival UCLA 13–9. This eliminated the Trojans from championship contention and opened the door for Florida to become Ohio State's opponent. The Trojans did earn a Rose Bowl bid and defeated Michigan 32–18. It was the Trojans' fifth straight BCS Bowl appearance.

On January 6, 2007, six days after the Rose Bowl Game, USC kicker Mario Danelo was found dead at the bottom of the White Point Cliff near Point Fermin Lighthouse in San Pedro, California.

2007
In July 2007, ESPN.com named USC its No. 1 team of the decade for the period between 1996 and 2006, citing the Trojans' renaissance and dominance under Carroll.

The 2007 Trojans were the presumptive No. 1 pick before the season. However, they lost two games, including a major upset to 41-point underdog Stanford, and they did not get into the National Championship game. However, the Trojans did win their sixth conference championship and defeated Illinois in the 2008 Rose Bowl Game.

Under Carroll, USC was known to attract numerous celebrities to its practices, including USC alumni Will Ferrell, George Lucas, LeVar Burton, and Sophia Bush as well as Snoop Dogg, Henry Winkler, Kirsten Dunst, Nick Lachey, Dr. Dre, Spike Lee, Alyssa Milano, Flea, Wilmer Valderrama, Jake Gyllenhaal and Andre 3000. The Trojans benefited from Los Angeles's lack of NFL teams (with the Los Angeles Rams and Raiders having left in the early 1990s), combined with the Trojans' 21st century success, leading them to sometimes be called LA's "de facto NFL team."

During Pete Carroll's first eight years as head coach, USC lost only one game by more than seven points, a 27–16 loss at Notre Dame in his first season, until the second half of the 2009 season. The early part of the 2000s also saw the rise of USC football's popularity in the Los Angeles market: without any stadium expansions, USC broke its average home attendance record four times in a row: reaching 77,804 in 2003, 85,229 in 2004, 90,812 in 2005 and over 91,416 with one game to go in 2006 (the capacity of the Coliseum is 92,000). As of 2022, USC is one of only two of the 131 Football Bowl Subdivision (formerly Division I-A) teams to have never played a Football Championship Subdivision (formerly Division I-AA) team since the split of Division I football in 1978.

2008

After beating Penn State in the Rose Bowl, USC finished the season 12–1, and ranked No. 2 in the Coaches' Poll and No. 3 in the AP Poll. The 2008 season culminated in USC's seventh straight Pac-10 Championship, seventh straight BCS bowl appearance and seventh straight finish in the top 4 of the AP Poll. This also marked seven consecutive seasons where USC has not lost a game by more than 7 points. Their only loss was on the road against Oregon State, which was mentioned in the preseason as a possible upset.

2009
After beating Boston College in the Emerald Bowl, USC finished the season 9–4, and ranked No. 20 in the Coaches' Poll and No. 22 in the AP Poll. USC ended its seven-year streak of Pac-10 Championship, BCS bowl appearance and top 4 finish of the AP Poll. The Trojans started the season strong beating No. 8 Ohio State at The Horseshoe. But they would lose to four Pac-10 teams (Washington, Oregon, Stanford, and Arizona). Blowout losses to Oregon 47–20 and Stanford 55–21 marked a turning point in USC's season and sparked debate in the media about the future dominance of USC football. After the season concluded, head coach Pete Carroll resigned to accept a head coaching position with the Seattle Seahawks.

In 2009, USC was named "Team of the Decade" by both CBSSports.com and Football.com, as well as the "Program of the Decade" by SI.com, plus was No. 1 in CollegeFootballNews.com's "5-Year Program Rankings" and was ranked No. 2 in ESPN.com's "Prestige Rankings" among all schools since 1936 (behind Oklahoma).  Additionally, in 2009, ESPN.com ranked USC the second-best program in college football history.

2010
On January 12, 2010, Lane Kiffin was hired as the head coach. This came following Pete Carroll's departure from USC to become the head coach of the Seattle Seahawks.

In June 2010, after a prolonged four-year investigation into whether former USC running back Reggie Bush and his family had accepted financial benefits and housing from two sports agents in San Diego while he was a student athlete at USC, the NCAA imposed sanctions against the Trojan football program for a "lack of institutional control," including a two-year postseason ban, the loss of 30 scholarships over three years, and the vacation of all wins in which Bush participated as an "ineligible" player, including the 2005 Orange Bowl, in which the Trojans won the BCS National Championship. These sanctions have been criticized by many NCAA football writers, including ESPN's Ted Miller, who wrote, "It's become an accepted fact among informed college football observers that the NCAA sanctions against USC were a travesty of justice, and the NCAA's refusal to revisit that travesty are a massive act of cowardice on the part of the organization."

The 2010 team finished 8–5 (5–4 in the Pac-10) and was ineligible for post-season play.

2011
On February 9, 2010, Commissioner Larry Scott announced that the Pac-10 would be considering expanding to twelve schools. The Pac-10 Conference officially became the Pac-12 Conference following the addition of Colorado and Utah on July 1, 2011.

In 2011, although USC finished in first place in its conference division with a 7–2 record, due to their ineligibility to participate in a bowl game, the UCLA Bruins became champions of the inaugural Pac-12 South Division. In the final regular-season game, USC's 50–0 win over UCLA was the largest margin of victory in the rivalry since 1930.

The release of the December 4, 2011, final regular-season Associated Press college football poll marked USC's return to national prominence with the No. 5 ranking. The Trojans were not eligible for postseason play and did not participate in any Bowl game. When the final AP Football Poll was released, USC dropped one spot to the No. 6 ranking.

2012
USC was ranked number one in The Associated Press' preseason college football poll for the seventh time in school history and the first time in five seasons, edging out No. 2 Alabama and No. 3 LSU. However, the early season expectations would backfire as the Trojans would eventually finish 7–5 (5–4 versus Pac-12 opponents), including losses to all three of their major rivals (Notre Dame, UCLA, and Stanford) all in the same year for the first time since 1992. The team finished second in the Pac-12 South standings and unranked in any poll.

2013
The 2013 USC Trojans football team finished the season 10–4, 6–3 in Pac-12 play to finish in a tie for second place in the South Division. They were invited to the Las Vegas Bowl where they defeated Fresno State. Head coach Lane Kiffin, who was in his fourth year, was fired on September 29 after a 3–2 start to the season. He was replaced by interim head coach Ed Orgeron. At the end of the regular season, Washington head coach Steve Sarkisian was hired as the new head coach beginning in 2014. This prompted Orgeron to resign before the bowl game. Clay Helton led the Trojans in the Las Vegas Bowl.

2014 
Steve Sarkisian, in his first year as head coach at USC, led the Trojans to a 9–4 season (6–3 in the Pac-12) to finish in a three-way tie for second place in the South Division. They were invited to the Holiday Bowl where they defeated Nebraska 45-42. On September 8, 2014, Sarkisian and athletic director Pat Haden were reprimanded by Pac-12 Conference commissioner Larry Scott for attempting "to influence the officiating, and ultimately the outcome of a contest" during the game against Stanford two days earlier.

2015
The 2015 season was a tumultuous one for the Trojans with a season record of 8–4 overall and 6–3 in Pac-12 play to finish as Pac-12 Southern Conference champions. Mid-season, coach Steve Sarkisian was fired to deal with personal issues, and Clay Helton was again named the interim head coach. ESPN later reported that Sarkisian came to a pre-practice meeting, appearing to be intoxicated. According to Scott Wolf, the USC beat writer for the Los Angeles Daily News, several players smelled alcohol on Sarkisian's breath.

The Trojans had lost to Stanford and Washington under Sarkisian. Under Helton, USC lost to Notre Dame, but then rallied to win the next four games. A loss to Oregon left the South Division conference championship to be decided by the USC-UCLA game; USC won 40–21. USC played in its first-ever Pac-12 Conference championship game, losing to Stanford (41–22) after the Cardinal (8-1 in Pac-12, 9-2 overall) locked up the North Division title, its third in four years, with its victory over California.  USC went on to lose the 2015 Holiday Bowl 23–21 to the Wisconsin Badgers. Zach Banner started all 14 games at tackle, was First Team All-Pac-12, and won USC's Offensive Lineman of the Year Award after allowing only nine total pressures on 426 pass attempts, according to Pro Football Focus, which graded him as the season's top pass-blocking right tackle. On December 7, Sarkisian filed a $30 million termination lawsuit against USC.[25]

2016
The 2016 USC Trojans football season marked Clay Helton's first full season as USC head coach. The team finished the season 10–3, (7–2 Pac-12), finishing as the runner-up of the South Division title and as Rose Bowl champions. After a 1–3 start during the month of September that featured losses to teams such as No. 1 Alabama, No. 7 Stanford, and No. 24 Utah, the Trojans began a nine-game winning streak to end their season. Some notable wins include victories over No. 21 Colorado, No. 4 Washington, and No. 5 Penn State in the Rose Bowl. Sam Darnold, a redshirt freshman quarterback, became the starter over Max Browne (1–2 record as starting QB) a few days before the Utah game. With that, the Trojans received much-needed stability after years of turmoil and coaching changes. The season was capped off with a dramatic 52–49 win in the Rose Bowl over Penn State, their first Rose Bowl victory in 8 years. USC finished No. 3 in the final AP polls for the season. Zach Banner, captain of the team, was again All-Pac-12 first-team, was CollegeSportsMadness.com All American first-team, Senior CLASS Award All-American first-team, Phil Steele All-Pac-12 first-team, a finalist for the Senior CLASS Award (given to the nation's top senior excelling in community/classroom/character/competition), and was the team's Co-Offensive Lineman of the Year.

2017 
Entering the season, the Trojans were ranked No. 4 in the AP Poll's preseason rankings. They finished the season 11–3, 8–1 in Pac-12, to be champions of the South Division. They represented the South Division in the Pac-12 Championship Game where they defeated Stanford to become Pac-12 Champions. They were invited to play in the Cotton Bowl against Ohio State, but lost 24–7. In the final AP poll, they were ranked No. 12.

Notable players to depart to the NFL include Sam Darnold and Ronald Jones II. Darnold is the 5th USC quarterback to be drafted in the first round of the NFL since 1967.

2018 
Through ranked No. 15 in the AP Poll's preseason rankings, the Trojans finished the season 5–7, (4–5 Pac-12), the program's first losing record since 2000 where they held the same record. USC lost to both of its major rivals, UCLA and Notre Dame, in the same season for the first time since 2013, and it also lost to all other California Pac-12 schools (UCLA, California, and Stanford) in the same season for the first time since 1996. They tied Arizona for third place in the Pac-12 South Division.

On November 25, USC athletic director Lynn Swann announced that head coach Clay Helton would return in 2019.

2019 
The Trojans finished the regular season 8–4, (7–2 Pac-12), holding second place in the Pac-12's South Division. USC was 2–3 against ranked teams. Following the regular season, they lost to the Iowa Hawkeyes in the Holiday Bowl 24–49.

2020 
On September 24, the conference announced that a six-game conference-only season would begin on November 6 with the conference's championship game to be played on December 18 after initially announcing in August that all fall sports competitions were cancelled due to the COVID-19 pandemic. Teams not selected for the championship game would be seeded to play a seventh game.

The Trojans finished the regular season with a 5–0 record, and qualified for the Pac-12 Championship Game, which they lost to Oregon 24–31. The following day, USC announced that it would not play in any bowl game, ending the season with an overall 5–1 record.

2021 
The Trojans were led by sixth-year head coach Clay Helton in the first two games. Helton was subsequently fired on September 13 following the team's 42–28 loss to Stanford. Associate head coach Donte Williams took over as the team's interim head coach. They finished the 2021 season with 4–8, their worst record since 1991 where they went 3–8. They were not bowl eligible for the second time in 4 years (they were not bowl eligible the 2018 season after finishing with a 5-7 record).

2022 
On November 28, 2021, Lincoln Riley was named the 30th head coach coming off of a five year stint at Oklahoma. First-year offensive coordinator Josh Henson and first-year defensive coordinator Alex Grinch are both intended to coach alongside him for the season. As of February 28, USC's recruiting class was ranked 65th among NCAA D1 schools. A notable incoming transfer is QB Caleb Williams, who reunites with Lincoln Riley from Oklahoma. The Trojans went on to improve dramatically over their 2021 season, going from finishing 4-8, to 10-1, and being ranked #5 in the AP poll as of Week 12. During Lincoln Riley's inaugural season, the Trojans racked up wins against Rice 66-14, Stanford 41-28, Fresno State 45-17, Oregon State 17-14, Arizona State 42-25, and Washington State 30-14 before losing a close match to #20 ranked Utah 43-42. After this setback, the Trojans would bounce back and go on to beat Arizona 45-37, California 41-35, Colorado 55-17, and #16 ranked UCLA 48-45, clinching them a spot in the Pac-12 Championship.

Conference affiliations
 Independent (1888–1921)
 Pac-12 Conference (1922–present)
 Pacific Coast Conference (1922–1958)
 Athletic Association of Western Universities (1959–1967)
 Pacific-8 Conference (1968–1977)
 Pacific-10 Conference (1978–2010)
 Pac-12 Conference (2011–present)
 Big 10 (as early as 2024)

Championships

National championships
USC has won 17 national championships from NCAA-designated major selectors. USC claims 11 national titles, including 7 from the major wire-service AP Poll and/or Coaches' Poll. Two of USC's championships, 1928 and 1939, are based on the Dickinson System, a formula devised by a University of Illinois professor that awarded national championships between 1926 and 1940. The Dickinson System is cited in the Official 2010 NCAA FBS Record Book as a legitimate national title selector.  USC's claim is consistent with other FBS programs that won the Dickinson title.  In 2004, USC recognized the 1939 squad as one of their national championship teams. The 2004 team was forced to vacate the final two games of its season, including the 2005 Orange Bowl due to NCAA sanctions incurred as a result of loss of institutional control, and namely, in connection with Reggie Bush. USC appealed the sanctions, delaying consideration of vacating USC's 2004 championship by the BCS. Ultimately, USC lost the appeals and forfeited the 2004 BCS championship. The AP did not vacate its 2004 championship, hence the Trojans retain a share of the national title.

^Claimed national championships - USC claims the 1928, 1931, 1932, 1939, 1962, 1967, 1972, 1974, 1978, 2003, and 2004 championships.

† The FWAA stripped USC of its 2004 Grantland Rice Trophy and vacated the selection of its national champion for 2004. The BCS also vacated USC's participation in the 2005 Orange Bowl and USC's 2004 BCS National Championship, and the AFCA Coaches' Poll Trophy was returned. In addition to the Orange Bowl victory over Oklahoma, the 2004 regular season finale win against UCLA was also vacated, making the official record of 2004 USC Trojans 11-0.

Conference championships
USC has won 39 conference championships, all within the Pac-12 Conference or its predecessors. The 2004 and 2005 championships were vacated.

 1927†, 1928, 1929, 1931, 1932, 1938†, 1939, 1943, 1944, 1945, 1947, 1952, 1959†, 1962, 1964†, 1966, 1967, 1968, 1969, 1972, 1973, 1974, 1976, 1978, 1979, 1984, 1987†, 1988, 1989, 1993†, 1995†, 2002†, 2003, 2004^, 2005^, 2006†, 2007†, 2008, 2017

† Co-championship

^ Vacated due to NCAA penalty

Division championships
USC has won 3 division championships, all in the South division of the Pac-12.

† Co-championship

Bowl games 

USC has a bowl game record of 34–20 through the 2019 season. The Trojans appeared in 34 Rose Bowls, winning 25, both records for the bowl. These are also the most times a team has appeared in or won any bowl game. USC was banned from entering a bowl during either the 2010 or 2011 seasons as part of the extremely extensive sanctions resulting from the University of Southern California athletics scandal.
Below is the list of USC's ten most recent bowl appearances.

Head coaches
USC head coaches from 1888 to present.

† Does not include 14 wins and 1 loss vacated due to NCAA penaltyIn 2013, Kiffin was fired after first 5 games, Orgeron served as interim head coach for next 8 games before resigning and Helton was interim head coach for bowl game. In 2015, Sarkisian was fired after first 5 games and Helton was interim head coach for next 7 games before becoming permanent head coach. In 2021, Helton was fired after first 2 games and Williams will serve as interim head coach for next 10 games.

Coaching staff

Traditions

Tailback U 
USC is sometimes called "Tailback U" (Tailback University) because a number of running backs who played for the Trojans won the Heisman Trophy. These running backs include Mike Garrett (1965), O. J. Simpson (1968), Charles White (1979), Marcus Allen (1981), and Reggie Bush (2005).

"Fight On"
"Fight On" is the fight song of the USC Trojans. The term "Fight On" is also used as a battle cry, often with the two finger "V" salute for Victory given in accompaniment. The V gesture has its origins with the ancient Trojans, who would cut off the index and middle finger of soldiers they conquered so the conquered could no longer wield a sword in battle.

Jersey No. 55 
"Tradition surrounds certain numbers at USC, most notably 55," wrote Gary Klein of the Los Angeles Times. "Junior Seau, Willie McGinest, Chris Claiborne and Keith Rivers," he added, "are among the linebackers who have worn a number that Trojans coaches have been careful to distribute." Wrote Andy Kamenetzky of ESPN.com in an article titled "Tradition of elite linebackers alive in 55," "Membership, along with the hallowed No. 55 jersey, has been offered to a select few over the past few decades. Names such as Junior Seau. Keith Rivers. Willie McGinest. Chris Claiborne. Names forever etched in USC lore."

Rivalries
In the first 30 years of USC football, the school maintained rivalries with local Southern California schools like Occidental and Pomona, but these ended by the 1920s when USC joined the PCC and grew into a national caliber team.

"Perfect Day"
A "Perfect Day" (a phrase created by the school's football announcer Pete Arbogast) to any USC fan is a USC win coupled with losses by UCLA and Notre Dame. There have been 63 "Perfect Days" since the first one occurred in 1921. Perfect days have been possible since 1919, when UCLA began playing football.

Notre Dame

USC plays Notre Dame each year, with the winner keeping the Jeweled Shillelagh. The inter-sectional game has featured more national championship teams, Heisman trophy winners, All-Americans, and future NFL hall-of-famers than any other collegiate match-up. The two schools have played the game annually since 1926 (except for years 1943–1945 when World War II travel restrictions kept the game from being played or 2020 due to the COVID-19 pandemic). Unlike most rivalry games, the game enjoys neither the possibility of acquiring regional "bragging rights" nor the import of intra-league play. The game has been referred to as the greatest inter-sectional rivalry in college football. Notre Dame leads the series 50–36–5 through the 2022 season.

UCLA

USC's rivalry with UCLA is unusual in that they are one of a few pairs of Division I FBS programs that share a major city, as well as conference. Until 1982, the two schools also shared the same stadium: the Los Angeles Memorial Coliseum.

The crosstown rivals play each year for city bragging rights and the Victory Bell; and often for the right to go to the Rose Bowl as representative for the Pac-12. The UCLA rivalry tends to draw the focus of student supporters since many USC students have friends or family members attending "that other school" (of course, many UCLA students refer to their USC friends in the same manner) and many Southern California families are divided between Trojan Cardinal and Bruin Blue. The annual matchup always has both teams wearing their traditional home uniforms, featuring a Cardinal vs Blue matchup. USC leads the all-time series 50–33–7 through the 2022 season.

Stanford 

Stanford is USC's oldest rival, in a series that dates to 1905. In the early years of football on the West Coast, the power sat in the Bay Area with the Stanford-Cal rivalry and USC rose to challenge the two established programs. During the early and mid-20th century Stanford football occasionally enjoyed periods of great regional success on the gridiron. USC and Stanford, being the two private universities with major football teams on the west coast, naturally drew the ire of one another. During the early 2000s, however, Stanford had not maintained their earlier success and the rivalry had faded to many USC fans.

The rivalry was renewed with the arrival of Jim Harbaugh at Stanford in 2007. Harbaugh defeated Carroll 2–1 in their three matchups with both victories occurring in the Coliseum. In the 2009 meeting, USC sustained their worst loss in 43 years and surrendered the most points to an opponent, a record that would stand for three seasons.  The game led the Los Angeles Times to declare that Stanford was "at the top of the USC 'Must Kill' list." Harbaugh added another win in 2010 against Carroll's successor Lane Kiffin before leaving after that season to become head coach of the San Francisco 49ers.

USC leads the series 63–34–3 through the 2022 season.

Facilities

Early facilities
Prior to the construction of the Los Angeles Memorial Coliseum in 1923, the Trojans played football in a number of facilities. Before 1893, the Trojans played football in a vacant lot on Jefferson Boulevard before the lot was developed as residences. In the 1890s, USC's primary home field was Athletic Park. Several games in the 1890s and all games in 1916 were played in Fiesta Park in downtown Los Angeles. The 1900 homestand was played at Chutes Park, a facility located within a Los Angeles pleasure park shared with the Los Angeles Angels baseball team, while the 1903 season was played at nearby Prager Park. Three games in the 1910s were played at Washington Park, the successor to Chutes Park. From 1904 to 1910, 1914–15, and 1917–22, most of USC's home games were played at the on-campus Bovard Field. USC also played home games in Pasadena, at Sportsman's Park, Tournament Park, and the Rose Bowl.

Los Angeles Memorial Coliseum

The Los Angeles Memorial Coliseum is one of the largest stadiums in the United States. USC has played football in the Coliseum ever since the grand stadium was built in 1923. In fact, the Trojans played in the first varsity football game ever held there (beating Pomona College 23–7 on October 6, 1923).

The Coliseum hosted the opening and closing ceremonies and track events of the 1932 and 1984 Summer Olympics, and is slated to be a venue for the 2028 Summer Olympics. Over the years, the Coliseum has been home to many sports teams besides the Trojans, including UCLA football, the NFL's Los Angeles Rams and Raiders, the Los Angeles Chargers in 1960 of the AFL, and Los Angeles Dodgers baseball, including the 1959 World Series. The Coliseum has hosted various other events, from concerts and speeches to track meets and motorcycle races. It has also earned the nickname, “The Grand Old Lady.”

The Coliseum is both managed and operated by USC under a master lease agreement with the LA Memorial Coliseum Commission, as was the Los Angeles Memorial Sports Arena for a number of years prior to its 2016 demolition. The Coliseum has a present full-capacity of 77,500 seats after USC completed a major $315 million renovation of the stadium in 2019 that added a new seven-story  Tower on the stadium’s south side housing luxury suites, loge boxes, club seats, a new concourse with concession stands, a new press box, and rooftop club lounge.

The John McKay Center at USC
Opened in 2012, the $70 Million, 110,000-square-foot athletic and academic center named after legendary football coach John McKay is home to the USC Trojan Football Department. The building houses meeting rooms, coaches' offices and a locker room for the football program, as well as the Stevens Academic Center (including space for tutoring, counseling, study and computer rooms for student-athletes), a weight room, an athletic training room and a state-of-the-art digital media production facility for all of USC's 21 sports.

The centerpiece of the McKay Center is the two-story video board in the Parker Hughes atrium, which can display six big-screen televisions at once as well as promotional videos and graphics. The building's 60,000-square-foot basement includes a weight room, athletic training room, locker rooms and a players lounge, a 25,000-square-foot ground floor with Student-Athlete Academic Services center, a reception area and outdoor courtyard, and a 25,000-square-foot second floor with football coaches' offices, football team meeting rooms, outdoor patio and a state-of-the-art video production facility. The John McKay Center is adjacent to Heritage Hall, the Galen Dining Center, Brittingham Field and the Howard Jones Field/Brian Kennedy Field practice facility.

Howard Jones Field/Brian Kennedy Field

The USC football team practices on campus at Howard Jones Field/Brian Kennedy Field. The facility originally known as Howard Jones Field was expanded in the fall of 1998 to include Brian Kennedy Field. In early 1999, Goux's Gate, named for the player and popular long-time assistant coach Marv Goux, was erected at the entrance to the practice field.

Individual award winners

Individual players have won numerous accolades with seven officially recognized Heisman Trophy winners, 38 College Football Hall of Fame inductees, and 157 All-Americans. USC's first consensus All-American was offensive guard Brice Taylor in 1925, who notably excelled despite missing his left hand, and who was one of USC's first black players.

Heisman Trophy winners and retired numbers 

Eight USC players have been awarded the Heisman Trophy. All of them (with the exception of Reggie Bush and Caleb Williams) have also their numbers retired by the Trojans. Bush's Heisman was forfeited in 2010 after an NCAA investigation ruled him ineligible to participate as a student-athlete during his Trophy season.

Special cases 

Notes

Heisman Trophy voting

All-time USC football team
Chosen by Athlon Sports in 2001

Offense
WR: Lynn Swann 71-73
WR: Keyshawn Johnson 92-95
TE: Hal Bedsole 61-63
OL: Ron Yary 65-67
OL: Tay Brown 30-32
OL: Tony Boselli 91-94
OL: John Baker 29-31
OL: Brad Budde 76-79
OL: Anthony Muñoz 76-79
OL: Bruce Matthews 80-82
QB: Pat Haden 72-74
RB: Mike Garrett 63-65
RB: O. J. Simpson 67-68
RB: Charles White 76-79
RB: Marcus Allen 78-81
PK: Quin Rodriguez 87-90

Defense
DL: Ernie Smith 30-32
DL: Tim Ryan 86-89
DL: Harry Smith 37-39
DL: Aaron Rosenberg 31-33
LB: Chris Claiborne 96-98
LB: Richard Wood 72-74
LB: Jack Del Rio 81-84
LB: Junior Seau 88-89
DB: Ronnie Lott 77-80
DB: Morley Drury 25-27
DB: Mark Carrier 87-89
DB: Tim McDonald 83-86
P: Des Koch 51-53

National player awards 

 Maxwell Award
O. J. Simpson, TB (1968)
Charles White, TB (1979)
Marcus Allen, TB (1981)
Caleb Williams, QB (2022)
Archie Griffin Award
Matt Leinart, QB (2003, 2004)
Sam Darnold, QB (2016)
 Walter Camp Award
O. J. Simpson, TB (1967, 1968)
Charles White, TB (1979)
Marcus Allen, TB (1981)
Matt Leinart, QB (2004)
Reggie Bush, RB (2005)
Caleb Williams, QB (2022)
 Dick Butkus Award
Chris Claiborne, MLB (1998)

 Lombardi Award
Brad Budde, OG (1979)
 Chuck Bednarik Award
Rey Maualuga, LB (2008)
 AP Player of the Year
Matt Leinart, QB (2004)
Reggie Bush, RB (2005)
Caleb Williams, QB (2022)
 Manning Award
Matt Leinart, QB (2004)
 Johnny Unitas Golden Arm Award
Rodney Peete, QB (1988)
Carson Palmer, QB (2002)
Matt Leinart, QB (2005)
 Outland Trophy
Ron Yary, OT (1967)

 Jim Thorpe Award
Mark Carrier, FS (1989)
Adoree' Jackson, CB (2016)
 John Mackey Award
Fred Davis, TE (2007)
 Fred Biletnikoff Award
Marqise Lee, WR (2012)
 Jim Brown Award
Reggie Bush, RB (2005)
 Chic Harley Award
Mike Garrett, RB (1965)
O. J. Simpson, RB (1968)
Charles White, RB (1979)
Marcus Allen, RB (1981)
Reggie Bush, RB (2004, 2005)

 Paul Warfield Trophy
Keyshawn Johnson, WR (1995)
Dwayne Jarrett, WR (2005)
Marqise Lee, WR (2012)

National coaching awards 
 Paul "Bear" Bryant Award
John McKay, Head Coach (1962, 1972)
 Home Depot Coach of the Year Award
Pete Carroll, Head Coach (2003)
 Broyles Award
Norm Chow, Offensive coordinator (2002)
 FWAA Co-First Year Coach of the Year
Clay Helton, Head Coach (2017)

Hall of Fame

 College Football Hall of Fame inductees 

Pro Football Hall of Fame

 Frank Gifford, HB (1977)
 Ron Mix, OT (1979)
 Morris 'Red' Badgro, E (1981)
 O. J. Simpson, RB (1985)
 Willie Wood, DB (1989)
 Anthony Muñoz, OT (1998)
 Ronnie Lott, DB (2000)
 Lynn Swann, WR (2001)
 Ron Yary, OT (2001)
 Marcus Allen, RB (2003)
 Bruce Matthews, OT, OG, C (2007)
 Junior Seau, LB (2015)
 Troy Polamalu, S (2020)
 Tony Boselli, OT (2022)

Canadian Football League
 C.J. Gable, RB – Edmonton Eskimos
 Taylor Mays, S - Saskatchewan Roughriders

NFL
Among all colleges and universities, as of 2022, USC holds the all-time record for the most quarterbacks (17) and is tied with the University of Miami for the most wide receivers (40) to go on to play in the NFL.

Trojans in the entertainment industry
Beginning in the silent movie era, wrote Garry Wills, "USC football players mingled with the movie stars who came to their games and offered them bit parts in their movies." One such player was John Wayne, who played tackle on the 1925 and 1926 team; another was Ward Bond, who played on the 1926–1928 teams. (As a publicity stunt, the Atlanta Falcons drafted the 64-year-old John Wayne the 1971 NFL draft.)

Other Trojan football players who went on to have movie careers include O. J. Simpson (actor), Allan Graf (director and stunt coordinator), Aaron Rosenberg (producer), Mazio Royster (actor), Patrick O'Hara (actor), Russell Saunders (director), Nate Barragar (director), Jesse Hibbs (actor), Tim Rossovich (actor), Phil Hoover, Cotton Warburton (film editor), and Mike Henry (actor),Internet Movie Database: Mike Henry. Internet Movie Database. (Retrieved December 28, 2021.)

Media

 Radio flagship: KABC-AM 790 which also held the rights from 1973 to 1976.
 Spanish-language radio flagship: KTNQ 1020-AM in Glendale, California
 Broadcasters: Pete Arbogast (play-by-play), Shaun Cody and John Jackson share duties as color analyst with Jordan Moore acting as the sideline announcer.
 Spanish-language broadcasters: Pepe Mantilla (play-by-play), Daniel Arreola (analyst/play-by-play) and Erika Garza (analyst)
 Past broadcasters: Tom Kelly, Lee Hacksaw Hamilton, Larry Kahn, Mike Walden, Chick Hearn, have also been full time play-by-play announcers for the team since 1956.

Past color analysts include Paul McDonald, Tom Harmon, Braven Dyer, Bill Symes, Jim Wilkerson, Dick Danahe, Don Anderson, Bud Tucker, Jim Perry, Fred Gallagher, Mike Lamb and Jeremy Hogue.

Sideline announcers have been Arbogast, Jackson, Tony Femino, Tim Ryan, Petros Papadakis, Lindsey Soto, Mark Willard and Brandon Hancock.

Radio station KNX AM-1070 in Los Angeles has had the most years as the team's flagship station, holding that honor from 1956 to 1968 and again from 1977 to 1994. KFI AM-640 was the flagship from 1969 to 1972, KLSX FM-97.1 held the flag in 1998, followed by XTRA AM-690 in 1999 and 2000.  From 2001 to 2005, KMPC AM-1540 was the Trojans' flagship station. KSPN AM-710 was the flagship from 2006 to 2018.  Pete Arbogast, who has called Trojans football since 1989, announced his seventh Rose Bowl game on January 1, 2017. Arbogast also called the Rose Bowl game for USC for the university's campus radio station, KSCR, in 1978 and 1979.  Arbogast, Kelly and Walden are all members of the Southern California Sportscasters Hall of Fame.

 Public address announcer:''' Eric Smith
Previously:  John Ramsey (member of the Southern California Sportscasters Hall of Fame), and Dennis Packer.

Future non-conference opponents 
Announced schedules as of January 27, 2020.

See also
 Giles Pellerin, who attended 797 consecutive USC football games from 1925 until his death during the USC - UCLA game in 1998

References

External links

 

 
American football teams established in 1888
Trojans